Simon Percy (born 2 July 1971) is a New Zealand swimmer. He competed in three events at the 1992 Summer Olympics.

References

External links
 

1971 births
Living people
New Zealand male backstroke swimmers
Olympic swimmers of New Zealand
Swimmers at the 1992 Summer Olympics
Sportspeople from Chatham, Kent
20th-century New Zealand people
21st-century New Zealand people